The Atacama Giant is an anthropomorphic geoglyph on the Cerro Unitas area of the Atacama Desert, Chile. It is the largest prehistoric anthropomorphic. It has been suggested that the petroglyph represents a shaman, spiritual figure or deity, but there is little evidence to corroborate these claims.

The figure was an early astronomical calendar for knowing where the moon would set; by knowing this the day, crop cycle, and season could be determined. The points on the top and side of the head would say what season it would be depending on their alignment with the moon, which was important in determining when the rainy season would come in the barren Atacama.

The Atacama Giant is one out of nearly 5,000 geoglyphs - ancient artwork that is drawn into the landscape - that have been discovered in the Atacama region in the last three decades. It is believed that they are the work of several successive cultures that dwelt in this region of South America, including the Tiwanaku and Inca.

See also
 Paracas Candelabra
 Nazca Lines

References

Archaeological sites in Chile
Geoglyphs
Atacama Desert
Tourist attractions in Tarapacá Region
Hill figures
Geography of Tarapacá Region